Oxford Portraits in Science is a collection of biographies of famous scientists for young adults edited by the Harvard University astronomer Owen Gingerich.
Each book portrays the life and personality of an eminent scientist, and the thought processes by which they made their discoveries.

The series is notable as an example of the Sobel effect - an interest in popular accounts of scientific history and biography, stimulated by the success of the book Longitude written by journalist Dava Sobel.  Some works in this series have also been written by science journalists as well as scientists and science historians.

Works

References

Series of non-fiction books